Çalgi Çengi Ikimiz is a 2017 Turkish film. It was released in Turkey by Pinema on 6 January 2017. It is the second film of the series Çalgı Çengi.

Plot
Two musicians, Salih and Gürkan, described the adventures of their cousins.

Cast
Ahmet Kural - Gürkan
Murat Cemcir - Salih
Rasim Öztekin - Bünyamin 
Ayhan Taş - İsmet
Ahmet Gülhan - Kayınbaba
Ayşe Kökçü - Kaynana
Nur Erkul - Salih's love interest
Burak Satıbol - Samet
Şinasi Yurtsever - Mahmut
Ceyhun Güneş - Gökmen
İlker Yakut - Semih
Tuna Orhan - Mafya Yunus
Cahit Gök - Mafya Cemal
Barış Yıldız - Kaşıkçı
Korhan Herduran - Kaşıkçı
Samet Gürsel - Kaşıkçı

Reception

References

External links

2017 films
2010s Turkish-language films
Turkish sequel films
Turkish comedy films